Panthapuli is a village located near to Sankarankovil in Tenkasi district of Tamil Nadu, India. It is located on Tirunelveli-Rajapalayam Highway. The village became notable during the temple entry protest happened in late 2008.

Temple entry conflict 
Kannanallur Mariamman temple located in the village was closed for entry to everyone till December 2008 due to conflicts between Dalits and non-Dalits. Communist Party of India (Marxist) had announced temple entry with Dalits on 17 December 2008 which led to the vacation of about 400 non-Dalits leaving the village and settling down in nearby hillock.

Dalits were not allowed to enter the temple despite a ruling by a district court in favour of them. Consequently, Dalits left their village and settled down in the foot hills near to the village. Upon a Government order issued by Chief minister M. Karunanidhi, on 25 December 2008, Dalits led by the district collector G Prakash and Superintendent of Police Asra Garg entered the temple despite the protest and resentment of non-Dalits, following which it is to remain open and poojas be performed on a regular basis by all.

See also 
Temple Entry Proclamation
Vaikom Satyagraha

References 

Tirunelveli
Panthapuli Temply Entry